The Rhein-Pfalz-Kreis is a district (Kreis) in the east of Rhineland-Palatinate, Germany.

Neighboring districts are (from north clockwise) the district-free city Worms, the district Bergstraße, district-free Mannheim, Frankenthal and Ludwigshafen, Rhein-Neckar, district-free Speyer, the districts Karlsruhe, Germersheim, Südliche Weinstraße and Bad Dürkheim.

History
The district was created in 1886 under the name Bezirksamt Ludwigshafen, one of the last acts of king Ludwig II of Bavaria. The population in the area around Speyer had grown significantly, which made the splitting of the Bezirksamt Speyer necessary. In 1969, the Speyer and Ludwigshafen districts and parts of the Frankenthal and Neustadt districts were merged again to form the new Ludwigshafen district.

On May 19, 2003, the district parliament passed a resolution to rename the district "Rhein-Pfalz-Kreis" starting in 2004.

Partnerships
The district started its first partnership in 1964 with the municipalities Schnals and Naturns in Italy. The Speyer district had a partnership with Schlanders and Martell, also in Italy, which were taken over after the merging of the district. As part of the partnership of Rhineland-Palatinate with Rwanda the district has a partnership with the municipality of Kinyami starting in 1983. After the German reunification the district supported the Saalkreis in Saxony-Anhalt in modernising the administration to western standard, which resulted in a friendship between the two districts. In 1991 a partnership with the district Radviliskis in Lithuania was started, and in 2002 with the Polish district Opole in Silesia.

Geography
The district is located in the valley of the Rhine river, both the actual river valley and the Vorderpfälzer Tiefland, formed by the sediments of the rivers of the Palatinate hills. The district has a very warm climate, together with the fertile loess soil it makes the area favourable for growing vegetable. However the rainfall is comparatively low, thus irrigation is needed.

Coat of arms
The wavy line from the bottom-right to the top-left symbolizes the Rhine river.

The lion in the left is the lion of the Electorate of the Palatinate, to which the largest part of the district belonged historically.

The silver cross in the right part is taken from the State of Speyer, taken from the coat of arms of the Speyer district.

The shield in the middle show water lily leaves, a typical symbol for the district, as this plant grows in the old arms of the Rhine river.

Towns and municipalities

Verband-free municipalities

Verbandsgemeinden

*seat of the Verbandsgemeinde

References

External links

Official website (German)

 
Districts of Rhineland-Palatinate
Anterior Palatinate
1886 establishments in Germany